When Darkness Falls is a 2006 Swedish drama film directed by Anders Nilsson.

Cast 
 Oldoz Javidi - Leyla
 Lia Boysen - Carina
 Reuben Sallmander - Aram
 Per Graffman - Peter
 Bahar Pars - Nina
 Mina Azarian - Mamman
 Jacob Francis Worrall - Milo

References

External links 

2006 drama films
2006 films
Films about domestic violence
Swedish drama films
2000s Swedish-language films
2000s Swedish films